Oranienburger Tor is a Berlin U-Bahn station located on the .

The station was designed by Alfred Grenander, built in 1915, and officially opened on 30 January 1923.

Between April and June 1945, the station was closed because of war damage.

It was also a ghost station during the division of Berlin. It was reopened on 1 July 1990, when the border crossings came down.

References

External links 
 Umgebungsplan der BVG
 Beschreibung der Strecke bei Luise Berlin

U6 (Berlin U-Bahn) stations
Buildings and structures in Mitte
Railway stations in Germany opened in 1923